Antimius was the bishop of Pécs in the Kingdom of Hungary between around 1148 and 1158. A royal charter of 1148 refers to one Bishop Antimius without mentioning his see. However, it also lists one Bishop John who has consensually been identified with a bishop of Pécs, thus Antimius cannot be regarded as the head of the same see. Antimius witnessed an authentic charter of 1156 as bishop of Pécs. A non-authentic charter, which all the same may have preserved the memory of real events, refers to a court case proceeding between Antimius and the abbot of Pécsvárad over the tithes paid by twelve villages and two chapels.

References

 Koszta, László (2009). Antimius (1148?–1158?). In: A Pécsi Egyházmegye története I: A középkor évszázadai (1009–1543) (Szerkesztette: Fedeles Tamás, Sarbak Gábor, Sümegi József), p. 67. ("A History of the Diocese of Pécs, Volume I: Medieval Centuries, 1009–1543; Edited by Tamás Fedeles, Gábor Sarbak and József Sümegi"); Fény Kft.; Pécs; .

12th-century Roman Catholic bishops in Hungary
Bishops of Pécs
12th-century Hungarian people